Keskusta is a district of Jyväskylä, Finland formed by approximately 20 blocks in the city centre. Over 25.000 people live in Keskusta, an area of 0,6 km2 making the population density of the area about 8.500 / km2. Puistola, Harju and the Market Square are bordering Keskusta in the North. Lutakko, lake Jyväsjärvi and Seminaarinmäki campus of the University of Jyväskylä are bordering Keskusta in the South.

Gallery

References

Neighbourhoods of Jyväskylä